Oaklandazulasylum is a studio album by Yoni Wolf under the Why? moniker. It was released by Anticon on June 16, 2003. It peaked at number 85 on the CMJ Radio 200 chart.

Critical reception
At Metacritic, which assigns a weighted average score out of 100 to reviews from mainstream critics, the album received an average score of 70% based on 8 reviews, indicating "generally favorable reviews".

No Ripchord placed it at number 32 on the "Top 50 Albums of 2003" list. Stylus Magazine contributor Ethan White later said the album had an "anything-goes sound collage aesthetic" which made it "an engaging adventure, all the more charming for its faults. Some found it scattered, but to my ears the variety of the material meant that lackluster moments were easily absorbed into the rough-edged jumble that made up the whole."

Track listing

Personnel
Credits adapted from liner notes.

 Jonathan "Yoni" Wolf – vocals, production
 Jel – co-production (1, 4), drums (14)
 Odd Nosdam – sampler (11), art direction, photography
 Josiah Wolf – bass guitar (11)
 Doug McDiarmid – guitar (12)
 Alex Kort – cello (14)

References

External links
 

2003 albums
Anticon albums
Sound collage albums